The Tri-College Consortium (also known as the Tri-Co) is a collaboration among three private liberal arts colleges in the Philadelphia suburbs: Bryn Mawr College, Haverford College, and Swarthmore College. The consortium allows students to cross register for courses at the other colleges. Bryn Mawr and Haverford enjoy an especially close relationship (which students often refer to colloquially as "the Bi-Co"). The two schools share a student newspaper and radio station, and they have a fairly integrated student life. A bus transports students from campus to campus.

The Quaker Consortium is another consortium which joins the Tri-College with the University of Pennsylvania in Philadelphia.

References

Haverford College
 
Swarthmore College
. 
College and university associations and consortia in the United States